The  is a group of three kofun burial mounds located in the Yamate neighborhood of the city of Kakogawa, Hyōgo Prefecture, in the Kansai region of Japan. The tumuli were collectively designated a National Historic Site in 1973.

Overview
The Saijō Kofun cluster is located on a long terrace extending north from the Innanno Plateau on the east bank of the Kakogawa River, about ten kilometers from the river's mouth. The cluster consisted of dozens of tumuli, but most were destroyed due to the development of residential land, and now only three remain. An archaeological excavation was conducted in 1995-1996

It is orientated to the southwest and has an overall length of around 99 meters, making it the largest in Kakogawa City and one of the largest in the Harima region. On the surface of the mound, in addition to fukiishi,  a row of cylindrical haniwa can be seen. In addition, two extensions on the left and right of the mound constriction and two locations on the rear circle exist, which are believed to have had a ceremonial purpose, as representational haniwa have been found. The tumulus's surrounded by a double moat. The burial facilities in the posterior circular portion consist of three clay burials, which have not been investigated. Two more burials were found in the anterior portion, which included grave goods such as gold and copper engraved metal fittings, an iron ax, tubular bronze products, horse harness, and iron swords. It is estimated that this burial mound was built in the middle of the Kofun period, around the end of the 4th century to early 5th century. The horse harness is the oldest to have been discovered in the Kinai region of Japan, and the style of the grave goods indicates a strong cultural connection with the Korean Peninsula and mainland Asia.

Neither has been excavated, but they are believed to date from the 5th century.

The site is open to the public as an archaeological park, and is located about a 15-minute walk from Kanno Station on the JR West Kakogawa Line.

Gallery

See also
List of Historic Sites of Japan (Hyōgo)

References

External links

Kakogawa city Board of Education home page 

Kofun
Archaeological sites in Japan
History of Hyōgo Prefecture
Kakogawa, Hyōgo
Historic Sites of Japan